General elections were held in the Bahamas on 26 November 1962, the first under universal suffrage. Whilst the Progressive Liberal Party won the most votes, the United Bahamian Party won the most seats, largely as a result of gerrymandering.

Results

Elected MPs

References

Bahamas
1962 in the Bahamas
Elections in the Bahamas
Bahamas
Election and referendum articles with incomplete results